Kodály körönd (Kodály circus) is a station of the yellow M1 (Millennium Underground) line of the Budapest Metro, under Kodály körönd.  Like the square, the metro station takes its name from Zoltán Kodály who once lived in one of the buildings on the square. The station was opened on 2 May 1896 as part of the inaugural section of the Budapest Metro, between Vörösmarty tér and Széchenyi fürdő. This section, known as the Millennium Underground Railway, was the first metro system in continental Europe. In 2002, it was included into the World Heritage Site "Budapest, including the Banks of the Danube, the Buda Castle Quarter and Andrássy Avenue".

Connection
Bus: 105, 178

References

M1 (Budapest Metro) stations
Railway stations opened in 1896